Yaw Acheampong (born 6 September 1996) is a Ghanaian professional footballer who plays as a left-back for Ghanaian Premier League side Karela United.

Career 
Acheampong currently plays for Western Region-based club Karela United. He played 2 league matches in the 2019–20 Ghana Premier League season before the league was put on hold and later cancelled due to the COVID-19 pandemic. He was named in the club's squad list for the 2020–21 Ghana Premier League season.

References

External links 

 

Living people
1996 births
Association football defenders
Ghanaian footballers